Hagersville Secondary School (HSS) is a secondary school in Hagersville, Ontario, operated by the Grand Erie District School Board.

It was established in 1892. Its current campus was built in the period 1967–1968.

References

External links
 Hagersville Secondary School
 2018-2019 profile

High schools in Ontario
1892 establishments in Ontario
Educational institutions established in 1892